Chemické Listy (literally Chemical Sheets) is a monthly peer-reviewed scientific journal covering chemistry and published by the Czech Chemical Society as the journal of the Association of Czech Chemical Societies. Languages of publication are Czech and Slovak; English manuscripts can only be submitted upon invitation. The journal was established in 1876 by Karel Preis (Prague Polytechnic). The journal was initially focused on practical and technical chemistry but, after 1882, scientific contributions began to dominate. In 1922, Jaroslav Heyrovský (Nobel laureate, 1959) first published in Chemické Listy the basic principle of polarography: "Electrolysis With a Dropping Mercury Cathode".

Editors-in-chief 
The following persons are or have been editors-in-chief of the journal:

Abstracting and indexing
The journal is abstracted and indexed in Chemical Abstracts, Current Contents/Physical, Chemical & Earth Sciences, Science Citation Index, and Scopus. According to the Journal Citation Reports, the journal has a 2021 impact factor of 0.356.

References

External links

Chemistry journals
Monthly journals
Multilingual journals
Academic journals published by learned and professional societies
Publications established in 1876
1876 establishments in Austria-Hungary